François Rukeba (born 23 April 1912) was a Rwandan politician and rebel leader.

Early life 
François Rukeba was born on 23 April 1912 in Murehe, Ruanda-Urundi. He was considered ethnically Hutu by most Rwandans, though he was of mixed origins. According political scientist René Lemarchand, his father was Congolese while his mother was Hutukazi. According to Warren Weinstein, his maternal ancestry traced to the Shi people of the eastern Democratic Republic of the Congo.

Political career 
Rukeba was a close companion of the deposed Mwami (king) of Rwanda, Yuhi V Musinga. He was initially a subchief who presided over a jurisdiction near Cyangugu, but was dismissed by the Belgian colonial administration in 1944 after they ruled that he had falsified court register entries. In 1947 the administration served him with a deportation order, and the following year appealed to the Visiting United Nations Mission, accusing the authorities of mistreating him. He grew anti-Belgian in outlook and became a staunch supporter of the monarchy. He eventually found work as a merchant.

Throughout the 1950s, Rukeba petitioned the United Nations for reforms in Ruanda-Urundi. At the funeral of the late Mwami, Mutara III Rudahigwa, on 28 July 1959 Rukeba led the crowd in demanding the naming of a successor to the throne. In August he cofounded the Rwandese National Union (UNAR), a party which quickly became the political voice of Tutsi traditionalists, and was made its president. He founded the party's youth wing. UNAR organised a meeting in Kigali on 13 September, and there Rukeba declared the party's programme and criticised Belgian colonialism. He also declared that, "He who does not belong to this party will be regarded as the people's enemy, the Mwami's enemy, Rwanda's enemy."

Life in exile 
Rukeba went into exile in 1961, eventually settling in Burundi. The UNAR restorationists formed a government-in-exile shortly before Rwanda's independence, with Rukeba as Prime Minister. Internal disagreements led to a reforming of the government-in-exile in May 1963 with Michel Kayihura as Prime Minister and Rukeba retained as Minister of Defence. The exiled Mwami, Kigeli V Ndahindurwa, remained nominal head of state of this government, though in time Rukeba lost contact with him. On 3 October Rukeba was arrested by Burundian authorities for stealing weapons from Congolese rebels. He was released shortly thereafter due to parliamentary pressure placed upon the Burundian monarchy. He chose to support the Simba rebels in the eastern Congo in 1964, and regularly partook in their political meetings in Uvira. Rukeba's son, Jean Kayitare, mobilized a battalion of Rwandan exiles to fight on the Simbas' behalf.

In 1968 Rukeba was arrested on the orders of Burundian President Michel Micombero, after Micombero discovered he was Hutu. Upon being detained he told the authorities that he could place 700 armed men at their disposal in the event of a Hutu rebellion. He was released in 1969 and became a businessman. He was arrested again two years later during Micombero's purge of Tutsi-Banyaruguru and sentenced to death, though this was later reduced to a light sentence.

References

Works cited 
 
 
 
 

Rwandese National Union politicians
Rwandan rebels
1912 births
Year of death missing
Hutu people
Tribal chiefs